Longare is a town in the province of Vicenza, Veneto, Italy. It is on the intersection of SP247 and SP20.

Sources

(Google Maps)

Cities and towns in Veneto